Sex cord tumour with annular tubules (SCTAT) is a rare ovarian tumour in the sex cord group of gonadal tumours.

Pathology
These tumours may be seen in the context of Peutz–Jeghers syndrome or be sporadic.  Large tumours are more likely to be sporadic.  Small incidental tumours are more likely to be syndromic.

It has a distinctive appearance under the microscope, from which it derives its name.

Prognosis
Generally, they are considered to be benign; however, occasional malignant cases are reported.

See also
Ovarian cancer

References

External links 

Benign neoplasms